Michael Richard (1948–2006) was an American musician.

Michael Richard may also refer to:

Michael Wayne Richard (1959–2007), rapist and murderer
Mike Richard (born 1966), ice hockey player

See also
Michael Richards (disambiguation)